The round-tongued floating frog (Occidozyga martensii) is a species of frog in the family Dicroglossidae. Occidozyga magnapustulosus, distributed in scattered locations of northern Thailand and Laos, might be included within it.

Range and habitat
Occidozyga martensii is found throughout most of Indochina. It is found in Cambodia, southern China (Yunnan, Guangxi, Guangdong, and Hainan), Laos, northern peninsular Malaysia, Thailand, Vietnam, and possibly Myanmar.

Its natural habitats are subtropical or tropical moist lowland forest, rivers, intermittent rivers, swamps, freshwater marshes, intermittent freshwater marshes, ponds, irrigated land, and canals and ditches.

References

External links
Amphibian and Reptiles of Peninsular Malaysia - Occidozyga martensii

Occidozyga
Amphibians of Cambodia
Amphibians of China
Amphibians of Laos
Amphibians of Malaysia
Amphibians of Thailand
Amphibians of Vietnam
Taxonomy articles created by Polbot
Amphibians described in 1867
Taxa named by Wilhelm Peters